Jatinder Singh Sandhu (Kariha; died in 2011) was an Indian politician from the state of Punjab. He was a two term member of the Punjab Legislative Assembly, where he represented the Nawan Shahr Assembly Constituency as a member of the Shiromani Akali Dal.

Biography 
Kariha's father, Hardev Singh Kariha, was also involved in politics. Kariha was elected in both the 2000 and 2007 legislative elections.

Personal life 
Kariha died of a heart attack in 2011. He was survived by his wife, four daughters, a daughter-in-law, as well as two grandchildren.

References 

People from Punjab, India
Shiromani Akali Dal politicians
2011 deaths
Indian Sikhs
Punjab, India MLAs 2007–2012
Members of the Punjab Legislative Assembly
Year of birth missing
Place of birth missing
Date of death missing
Place of death missing